Dantu Muralikrishna (born 1962) is an Indian scientist, writer and singer based in Bhopal, Madhya Pradesh, India.

He was honored with Vishist Sanskrit Sevavrati award by the Ministry of Human Resource Development, Government of India for his contribution on Bhagavad Gita on the occasion of World Sanskrit Day in August 2019, in New Delhi.

Early life and education
Muralikrishna was born in 1962 at Kunavaram, Khammam district (now in East Godavari District) in Andhra Pradesh. His father was a teacher and his mother, a housewife.

He completed his bachelor's degree in Science from Government Arts College, Rajahmundry in Andhra Pradesh. Later he did his MSc in Chemistry from Kurukshetra University, Haryana. He holds a PhD from Barkatullah University, Bhopai.

Career
Muralikrishna started his career from "Rainbow Inks & Varnish" and then changed to a pharma company, named "Cepham Laboratories Limited" at Haryana. Later he established his career in Lupin Limited with his services in various units of the organization.

He developed various cost effective and environmentally friendly processes for drug substances and he has number of patents and paper publications in journals on his scientific developments.

Work on Bhagavad-Gita
Muralikrishna launched his audio albums on Bhagavad Gita, titled as "Sambhavami Yuge Yuge" in multiple languages. He is credited for conceptualization of various aspects from Bhagavad-Gita, useful for life management.

In his albums, he has composed and recited 108 Sanskrit verses based on Carnatic ragas and narrated the descriptions in Hindi, Telugu and in English in different audio albums in his own voice. His Sanskrit – Telugu and Sanskrit – Hindi audio albums of Bhagvad Gita were released by eminent Scholar, Vaddiparti Padmakar at Andhra Pradesh Bhavan, New Delhi which was organized by Delhi Telugu Sangham in association with Government of Andhra Pradesh on 16 June 2018.

His Sanskrit-English version of Audio Album of Bhagavad Gita was released by Nobel laureate Kailash Satyarthi, on 29 January 2020 at Kailash Satyarthi Children's Foundation, New Delhi. He authored books and published number of articles on management concepts in National and International Journals based on Bhagavad-Gita. He has made his albums and books publicly available for free of cost.

In August 2018, the Vice President of India, M. Venkaiah Naidu and the Governor of Madhya Pradesh, Anandiben Patel appreciated and honored him for his work on Bhagavad Gita.

Dr. D. Muralikrishna was one of the speakers in Bhagavad Gita Summit (from 10th - 14th December 2021) during Gita Jayanti at Dallas, Texas, US along with other notable personalities such as Swami Mukundananda Ji, Dr. Menas Kafatos, Mr. Shiv Khera, Kiran Bedi, Brahmacharini Gloria Arieira and others.

In Dec 2021, Chief Minister of Madhya Pradesh Sri Shivraj Singh Chouhan released the book "Master of Life Management" authored by Dr. Dantu Muralikrishna at Vidhan Sabha in CM's chamber in Bhopal. This book is based on the teachings of Shrimad Bhagwat Geeta.

Published works

Sambhavami Yuge Yuge, Audio label by Natraj Music Company, 2018 (Sanskrit-Telugu), ASIN BD7GHszzzxs
Sambhavami Yuge Yuge, Audio label by Natraj Music Company, 2018 (Sanskrit-Hindi), ASIN BD7GHszzzxs
Book of Bhagavadgita in Hindi (Sambhavami Yuge Yuge ), Indra Publishing, 2018, .
Book of Bhagavadgita in Telugu (Sambhavami Yuge Yuge ), Indra Publishing, 2018, 
Sambhavami Yuge Yuge, Audio label by Natraj Music Company, 2020 (Sanskrit-English)
Bhagavad Gita and Yoga; International Journal of Yoga and Allied; Dec 2019,
Human Values in Spirituality;  UGC Care Journal ISSN:2394-3114 Vol-40, Issue:5-March-2020
Master Of Life Management, January 2022, p;648, ISBN‎ 9390542529

Awards and honors
Vishist Sanskrit Sevavrati award 2019 from the Ministry of Human Resource Development, Government of India, on the occasion of World Sanskrit Day, organized by Rashtriya Sanskrit Sansthan New Delhi. This award consists of prize money of ₹100,000.
In January 2020, Dr. Dantu Muralikrishna Set the world record for International Book of Records for creating Maximum Audio Albums of Bhagavad Gita in Multiple Languages
In January 2020, Dr. Dantu Muralikrishna's name entered in "India Book of Records" for creating an audio album on Bhagavad Gita Shlokas.
In February 2020, Dr.Muralikrishna got the title of "Grand Master“ by “Asia  Book of Records" for creation of albums on Bhagavad-Gita
Another Best Paper Awards from International Journal of Human Resource Management
In January 2021, Dr. Dantu Muralikrishna was awarded with 'International Icon Award' and 'Rashtriya Gaurav Samman'
Dantu Murali Krishna was awarded with Visionary Leader of the Year 2021. He also received Primeminister's Appreciation letter from Prime Minister's Office (India) for his contribution towards education skill development and research.

See also
 List of Indian writers

References

Indian writers
Indian scientists
1962 births
People from Bhopal
Writers from Andhra Pradesh
Living people